The 1989 Junior League World Series took place from August 14–19 in Taylor, Michigan, United States. Manatí, Puerto Rico defeated Toccoa, Georgia in the championship game.

Teams

Results

References

Junior League World Series
Junior League World Series
Junior